2131 Mayall (1975 RA) is an inner main-belt asteroid discovered on September 3, 1975, by Arnold Klemola at the Lick Observatory and named in honor of Nicholas U. Mayall (1906–1993), director of the Kitt Peak National Observatory during 1960–1971, who also worked at Lick for many years. It is about 8 km (~5 miles) in diameter.

Photometric measurements of the asteroid made in 2005 at the Palmer Divide Observatory showed a light curve with a period of 2.572 ± 0.002 hours and a brightness variation of 0.08 ± 0.02 in magnitude.

This led to a follow up investigation in 2006, when another light curve was recorded. These observations did not indicate a binary asteroid type, but did add to the data set available for this asteroid; this asteroid is part of the Hungaria group.

See also
Nicholas U. Mayall Telescope (telescope named after the same astronomer)

References

External links 
 Lightcurve plot of 2131 Mayall, Palmer Divide Observatory, B. D. Warner (2009)
 Asteroids with Satellites, Robert Johnston, johnstonsarchive.net
 Asteroid Lightcurve Database (LCDB), query form (info )
 Dictionary of Minor Planet Names, Google books
 Asteroids and comets rotation curves, CdR – Observatoire de Genève, Raoul Behrend
 Discovery Circumstances: Numbered Minor Planets (1)-(5000) – Minor Planet Center
 
 

002131
Discoveries by Arnold Klemola
Named minor planets
002131
002131
002131
19750903